The boys' 10 kilometres walk competition at the 2010 Youth Olympic Games was held on 22 August 2010 in Bishan Stadium.

Schedule

Results

Final

Intermediate times:

External links
 iaaf.org - Men's 10km walk
 

Athletics at the 2010 Summer Youth Olympics